This is a list of episodes from Di Gi Charat television, film and original video animation series.

Di Gi Charat

Di Gi Charat - Summer Special 2000

Di Gi Charat - Christmas Special

Di Gi Charat - Ohanami Special

Di Gi Charat - Natsuyasumi Special

Di Gi Charat - Tsuyu Special

Di Gi Charat Theater - Leave it to Piyoko-pyo!

References

Episode Guide with extended information (through Internet Archive's Wayback Machine)

Di Gi Charat
Episodes